Frederick Adetokumboh M'Cormack (sometimes credited as Ade McCormack, Frederick McCormack, or Adetokumoh McCormack) (February 27, 1982) is a Sierra Leonean-born American actor, known for his roles in the television series Lost and Heroes.

Personal life
McCormack was born in Freetown to Sierra Leone Creole parents. He lived in Nigeria and Kenya before attending SUNY Purchase in New York. He currently resides in Los Angeles.

Career
He has appeared in numerous TV-series, and he portrayed a recurring character on Lost as Mr. Eko's deceased brother, Yemi. He also portrays the recurring role of Tuko on Heroes. He played Zeze Eto'o in 24, starring Kiefer Sutherland in season 7, episodes 4 and 5.

His first feature film was the Academy award-nominated Blood Diamond (2006), starring Leonardo DiCaprio, Jennifer Connelly and Djimon Hounsou.

Filmography
 2021 A Tale Dark & Grimm - Lord Meister
 2020 Blood of Zeus - Kofi
 2019 Boxed
 2018–2021 Castlevania - Isaac (voice) (TV, 18 episodes)
 2017 The Chosen (TV series)
 2014 Captain America: The Winter Soldier - French Radio Pirate 
 2013 Beyond the Mask - Joshua Brand 
 2011 Battle: Los Angeles – "Doc"
 2009 24 – Zeze Eto'o (TV, 2 Episodes)
 2007 Heroes – Tuko (TV, 4 episodes)
 Chapter Five "Fight or Flight"
 Chapter Three "Kindred"
 Chapter Two "Lizards"
 Chapter One "Four Months Later..."
 2007 Without a Trace – Isaac Garang (TV, 1 episode)
 2006–2007 Gilmore Girls – Philip (TV, 3 episodes)
 2006 Blood Diamond – R.U.F. Trainer
 2006 Lost – Yemi (TV, 3 episodes)
 "The Cost of Living"
 "?"
 "The 23rd Psalm"
 2006 The Unit – Ammanuel (TV, 1 episode)
 2005 Whiskey Echo (TV) – Simon Mabor
 1995 The Great Elephant Escape (TV) – Jomo Batiany

References

External links
 
 An African Family Archive: The Lawsons of Little Popo/Aneho

Sierra Leonean emigrants to the United States
Living people
Sierra Leonean male actors
Sierra Leone Creole people
State University of New York at Purchase alumni
20th-century Sierra Leonean male actors
21st-century Sierra Leonean male actors
Sierra Leonean film actors
Sierra Leonean male television actors
1982 births